Inanidrilus bulbosus is a species of annelid worm. It is known from subtidal sands in the Atlantic coast of Florida.

References

bulbosus
Invertebrates of the United States
Fauna of the Atlantic Ocean
Taxa named by Christer Erséus
Animals described in 1979